The Red Flag Canal   is an irrigation canal located  northwest of Anyang in the northern extremity of Henan, China.

Geographic location
The canal begins close to the border of Henan and Shanxi. It diverts water from the Zhang River. The Zhang River flows from Shanxi and becomes the border between Hebei and Henan near to Handan. The dam is located near the corner of the three provinces. The canal winds around the side of a cliff,  through 42 tunnels  and along the side of the Taihang Mountains.

History
The canal was initiated during the Great Leap Forward and was built in the 1960s, with the main channel being completed in 1965. It was dug entirely by hand labour. The main canal is 71 kilometers long.

It irrigates the fields of the Linzhou district.

The Red Flag Canal was considered to be a great achievement of the Chinese workers in the 1960s and was the subject of several movies. The Red Flag Canal was featured in propaganda both internal and external to China, as an exemplar of what workers could achieve and local mass initiative.

Linzhou (then called Linxian) and the Red Flag Canal were visited by the Italian film director Michelangelo Antonioni when he made his documentary film Chung Kuo, Cina about China during the Cultural Revolution in 1972.

See also
 History of canals in China

References

Buildings and structures in Henan
Canals in China
Irrigation in China
Irrigation canals
Canals opened in 1965
Major National Historical and Cultural Sites in Henan